BC Gladiator Cluj-Napoca was a Romanian professional basketball club, based in Cluj-Napoca, Romania. The team promoted for the first time in Division A in 2009, only two years after being founded. After Gladiator's promotion, Cluj-Napoca became the first city of Romania, except for the capital Bucharest, with more than one team in the first division.

External links
Official Website

Sport in Cluj-Napoca
Defunct basketball teams in Romania
Basketball teams established in 2007
Basketball teams disestablished in 2013
2007 establishments in Romania
2013 disestablishments in Romania